In Greek mythology, the name Thronia (Ancient Greek: Θρωνία) or Thronie (Θρωνίη) may refer to:

 Thronia, daughter of King Belus of Egypt and possibly of either Achiroe or Side. She was the mother of Arabus, the eponym of Arabia, by Hermes.
 Thronia, a Naiad nymph, mother of Abderus by Poseidon and the eponym of the city Thronion in Opuntian Locris.

Notes

References 

 Apollodorus, The Library with an English Translation by Sir James George Frazer, F.B.A., F.R.S. in 2 Volumes, Cambridge, MA, Harvard University Press; London, William Heinemann Ltd. 1921. . Online version at the Perseus Digital Library. Greek text available from the same website.
Hesiod, Catalogue of Women from Homeric Hymns, Epic Cycle, Homerica translated by Evelyn-White, H G. Loeb Classical Library Volume 57. London: William Heinemann, 1914. Online version at theoi.com
 Strabo, The Geography of Strabo. Edition by H.L. Jones. Cambridge, Mass.: Harvard University Press; London: William Heinemann, Ltd. 1924. Online version at the Perseus Digital Library.
 Strabo, Geographica edited by A. Meineke. Leipzig: Teubner. 1877. Greek text available at the Perseus Digital Library.

Princesses in Greek mythology
Naiads
Women of Poseidon
Egyptian characters in Greek mythology